Sir Geoffrey Robert Clifton-Brown  (born 23 March 1953) is a British politician serving as Member of Parliament (MP) for The Cotswolds. He also serves as the treasurer of the 1922 Committee.

Early career
Geoffrey Clifton-Brown was born in Cambridge, elder son and eldest of four children of farmer Robert Lawrence Clifton-Brown (1929–2016), of Maltings Farmhouse, Haverhill, Suffolk, a councillor and mayor (2002) of St Edmundsbury, Suffolk, and (Florence) Elizabeth Lindsay (1926–2006), daughter of Ronald Arthur Vestey, of Great Thurlow Hall, Suffolk, DL, High Sheriff of Suffolk in 1961, and grand-daughter of Sir Edmund Hoyle Vestey, 1st Baronet. His paternal grandfather, Lt-Col Geoffrey Benedict Clifton-Brown, late of the 12th Royal Lancers, was MP for Bury St Edmunds, Suffolk from 1945 to 1950. He is a descendant of the Army officer and MP James Clifton Brown.

He was educated at Tormore School, in Upper Deal, Kent and then Eton College, before attending the Royal Agricultural College where he qualified as a chartered surveyor in 1975. He began his career as a graduate estate surveyor at the Property Services Agency in Dorchester and, later in 1975, became an investment surveyor  with Jones Lang Wootton. He became the vice chairman of the Norfolk North Conservative Association in 1984. He was elected as Constituency Chairman in 1986, a position he held until he resigned in 1991 in order to stand for election as a Conservative candidate.

Parliamentary career
During 1991, Clifton-Brown was selected as the candidate for the then Conservative parliamentary constituency of Cirencester and Tewkesbury, following the retirement of the former Cabinet minister Nicholas Ridley. He retained the seat at the 1992 general election, with a majority of 16,058, and made his maiden speech on 12 June 1992.

When newly elected he became a member of the Environment Select Committee, where he remained until 1995. Clifton-Brown was then appointed as the Parliamentary Private Secretary to Douglas Hogg, the Minister of Agriculture, Fisheries and Food.

Later his constituency was abolished, but he contested and was elected for the newly drawn constituency of Cotswold at the 1997 general election and returned to Parliament as a backbencher, whilst William Hague was the Leader of the Opposition. After Iain Duncan Smith became leader of the Conservative party, Clifton-Brown became the Shadow Minister for Local and Devolved Government Affairs in 2002. 
 
Following the 2005 general election, he retained the Cotswold seat and returned to Westminster as assistant Chief Conservative Whip. On the accession of David Cameron as Leader of the Conservative Party, he was appointed the Shadow Minister for Foreign Affairs, Trade and Investment.

Following the 2010 election and the formation of the subsequent Coalition government, Clifton-Brown returned to the back benches, making overseas visits in his role as Chairman of the Conservative Party's International Office. At this time he became the Parliamentary Chairman of the Conservative Friends of the Chinese. In 2014, he received critical attention in the media following a visit to China paid for by the Chinese authorities. In a 2015 interview with CNN, Clifton-Brown stated that his family has been doing business in China since the 1920s. Clifton-Brown has remained engaged in dialogue with Chinese authorities.

During the parliamentary expenses scandal in 2009, Clifton-Brown switched his main residence from his house in the Cotswolds to a London flat. The Cotswolds Conservative Party Association said that Clifton-Brown had acted within the rules.

In the 2018 New Year Honours, he was appointed a Knight Bachelor for political and public service.

In 2019, Clifton-Brown was asked to leave the Conservative Party Conference being held in Manchester, after a dispute with security staff who prevented him from entering a meeting room with a guest who did not have a relevant identification pass. According to a BBC Online report, he later apologised and described the incident as a "minor verbal misunderstanding".

He has previously been voted as the worst MP in parliament in a survey of constituents ranking MPs on categories such as attendance and helping constituents

Political heritage
Clifton-Brown is related to seven other previous members of Parliament, including his grandfather Geoffrey Benedict Clifton-Brown, and also his great-uncle Douglas Clifton Brown and his son-in-law Harry Hylton-Foster (married to Audrey Clifton-Brown) who both became Speaker of the House of Commons. His great-uncle Howard Clifton Brown was elected as member of Parliament on several occasions.

Registered interests 
Clifton-Brown is a partner in the East Beckham partnership, which engaged in arable farming in Norfolk. He has the use of a car belonging to the partnership, value £4,500 in 2020–21. (Updated 19 March 2014, 31 October 2019 and 11 November 2020). He drew £13,412.75 in respect of the year ending 30 September 2021 for 154 hours work. (Registered 28 October 2021).

He has five residential properties in London, purchased between 1994 and 2017.

Personal life 
In 1979, Clifton-Brown married Alexandra, daughter of Wing Commander Denis Noel Peto-Shepherd, RAF, of Great Durnford, Wiltshire. They have two sons and one daughter. They divorced in 2004. He is now married to Kym Erlich. He has an interest in UK-China relations and is chair of the Conservative Friends of the Chinese.  He is a Freeman of the City of London.

References

External links
 Geoffrey Clifton-Brown MP Official constituency website
 Geoffrey Clifton-Brown MP Conservative Party profile
 The Cotswolds Conservatives
 Profile Conservative Friends of the Chinese profile

Living people
1953 births
People educated at Eton College
Alumni of the Royal Agricultural University
Conservative Party (UK) MPs for English constituencies
UK MPs 1992–1997
UK MPs 1997–2001
UK MPs 2001–2005
UK MPs 2005–2010
UK MPs 2010–2015
UK MPs 2015–2017
UK MPs 2017–2019
UK MPs 2019–present
Knights Bachelor
Politicians awarded knighthoods